The 30 Albert Street is a future residential skyscraper to be located at 30 Albert Street in Brisbane, Australia. The tower will rise to 270.5m (274m AHD) which is currently the maximum height allowed in Brisbane central business district.

The 91-storey tower will include 857 apartments; one bedroom, two-bedroom, three-bedroom apartments and one penthouse. Recreation areas with pools and dining and lounge rooms will be located across three dual-level decks on the low-rise (levels 6–7), mid-rise (levels 66–67) and high-rise (levels 83–84). Retail space is planned for the ground floor levels.

Development application was lodged with the Brisbane City Council in August 2015 and replaced in August 2016.

See also

List of tallest buildings in Brisbane

References

External links
 Building at The Skyscraper Center database 

Skyscrapers in Brisbane
Residential skyscrapers in Australia
Proposed skyscrapers in Australia
Albert Street, Brisbane